Associazione Scientifica Interdisciplinare per lo Studio delle Malattie Respiratorie is the premiere thoracic society of Italy.

References

Pulmonology and respiratory therapy organizations
Medical and health organisations based in Italy